Umar Krupp, is a Ghanaian actor and producer. He is best known for his roles in the films House of Gold and Amakye and Dede.

Personal life
He was born in Accra, Ghana.

Career
In 2015, he won the award for the Best Actor at the Pan Africa Cinema Awards (PACA).

Krupp was nominated as Best African Producer for Nollywood Entertainment and Leadership Awards (NELAS) in 2019 for producing the movie Accra Hustlers. In 2019, Krupp directed the Ama which was theatrically released in January 2020. In 2018, he acted in the film Babani. He later won four awards at the Golden Movie Awards including; City People Entertainment Award for Face of Ghana Movies.

In 2020, an upcoming actress Serwaa Akoto issued a warning to actor Umar Krupp regarding her break up with Krupp and paying problems to the actress for a film.

Filmography

References

External links
 
 Actress Comes For Actor Umar Krupp For Chopping Her Without Paying?
 Krupp, Umar Overview

Living people
21st-century Ghanaian actors
1998 births
Ghanaian film actors
21st-century Ghanaian male singers
21st-century Ghanaian singers